Atamasthana or Eight sacred places are a series of locations in Sri Lanka where the Buddha had visited during his three visits to the country. The sacred places are known as Jaya Sri Maha Bodhiya, Ruwanwelisaya, Thuparamaya, Lovamahapaya, Abhayagiri Dagaba, Jetavanarama, Mirisaveti Stupa and Lankarama. They are situated in Anuradhapura, the capital of the ancient Anuradhapura Kingdom.

The sacred city of Anuradhapura exerted a considerable influence on the development of architecture in the country during several centuries. The city is nominated as a UNESCO World Heritage Site in 1982, it lies 205 km north of the current capital Colombo in island's North Central Province, on the banks of the historic Malvathu Oya.

According to the Mahavansa the sacred city was found around 350 BC by Pandukabhaya, the 1st king of the Anuradhapura kingdom and sixth since the arrival of Vijaya. It eventually become the principal shrines of Buddhism including the branch planted of the sacred fig tree, Bodhi tree from Bodhgaya, under which Siddharta attained spiritual enlightenment and supreme wisdom. The sacred tree brought there in the 3rd century BC during the second mission, led by Sangamitta, a Buddhist nun and daughter of Emperor Ashoka. The relics of Buddha have, moreover, shaped the religious topography of Anuradhapura, where the Thuparamaya was built by Devanampiya Tissa in the 3rd century BC to house the clavicle of Buddha, an important religious relic presented by Emperor Ashoka.

The city's apogee was reached under the reign of Dutthagamani who, in 161 BC, defeated the South Indian invader Ellalan re-establishing Buddhism in the place of Brahminism and endowed the site with extraordinary monuments including the Mirisaveti Stupa, Ruwanwelisaya, and the Brazen Palace. The city flourished for 1,300 years, then was abandoned after an invasion in 993. Later hidden away in dense jungle for many years, the splendid site, with its palaces, monasteries and monuments, is now accessible once again.

List of Atamasthana

Jaya Sri Maha Bodhi

Jaya Sri Maha Bodhi is a Sacred Fig tree in Anuradhapura, Sri Lanka. It is said to be a sapling from the historical Bodhi tree under which Buddha became enlightened. It was planted in 288 BC and is said to be the southern branch of the Sri Maha Bodhi Bodhgaya India, also the oldest living human-planted tree in the world with a known planting date. The sacred tree brought by the Ven. Sangamitta, the sister of Ven. Arahath Mahinda who introduced Buddha's teachings into Sri Lanka.

The area around the Sri Maha Bodhi, the Brazen Palace and Ruvanvelisaya dageba was once probably part of the Maha Vihara (Great Temple). The sacred bodhi tree is the oldest historically authenticated tree in the world, for it has been tended by an uninterrupted succession of guardians for over 2000 years, even during the periods of Indian occupation.

The Uda Maluwa, 35 feet by 55 feet, is 35 feet above the ground. The wall was constructed during the reign of King Kirthi Sri Rajasingha, to protect it from wild elephants. The late Ven. Pallegama Rewatha Thera had planted the Pariwara Bo trees (accompanying Bo trees) to camouflage the Bodhi to pd to safeguard it from natural disasters such as strong winds and rains.

All Sri Lankan Heads of State usually have sought the blessings of the Sri Maha Bodhi before commencing any important work.

Ruwanwelisaya

The Ruwanwelisaya is a stupa in Sri Lanka, considered a marvel for its architectural qualities and sacred to many Buddhists all over the world. It was built by King Dutugemunu, who became lord of all Sri Lanka after a war in which the Chola King Elara, was defeated. It is also known as Mahathupa, Swarnamali Chaitya, 	Suvarnamali Mahaceti (in Pali) and Rathnamali Dagaba. Also King Dutugemunu didn't live to see its completion of dageba but his final sight as he lay on his deathbed could be a false bamboo-and-cloth finish was placed around the dageba to show his ‘completed’ masterpiece.

Today, after incurring much damage from invading Indian forces, it rises 55m, considerably less than its original height; nor is its form the same as the earlier ‘bubble’ shape. A limestone statue south of the great dageba is popularly thought to be of King Dutugemunu.

Thuparamaya

Thuparamaya is a dageba in Anuradhapura, Sri Lanka. It is a Buddhist sacred place of veneration. Thera Mahinda, an envoy sent by King Ashoka himself introduced Theravada Buddhism and also chetiya worship to Sri Lanka. At his request King Devanampiyatissa built Thuparamaya in which was enshrined the collarbone of the Buddha. It is considered to be the first dagaba built in Sri Lanka following the introduction of Buddhism. This is considered the earliest monument, the construction of which was chronicled Sri Lanka. The name Thuparamaya comes from "stupa" and "aramaya" which is a residential complex for monks.

Thuparama dageba is the oldest dageba in Sri Lanka – indeed, probably the oldest visible dageba in the world. It was constructed by Devanampiya Tissa in the 3rd century BC and is said to contain the right collarbone of the Buddha. Its ‘heap-of-paddy-rice’ shape was restored in 1862 in a more conventional bell shape and to a height of 19m.

The surrounding vatadage's slender, capital-topped pillars, perhaps the dageba's most unusual feature, enclose the structure in four concentric circles. Impressions on the dageba pediments indicate the pillars originally numbered 176, of which 41 still stand. Although some Sri Lankan scholars believe these once supported a conical wooden roof, there is no archaeological evidence for this theory, nor does it follow any known antecedent in South India, whose dagebas were the prototypes for virtually all Sinhalese dagebas.

Lovamahapaya

Lovamahapaya is a building situated between Ruvanveliseya and Sri Mahabodiya in the ancient city of Anuradhapura, Sri Lanka. It is also known as the Brazen Palace or Lohaprasadaya because the roof was covered with bronze tiles.

It was originally built by King Dutugemunu more than 2000 years ago, but throughout the ages it was rebuilt many times, each time a little less grandiosely. There are remains of 1600 columns all that is left of this huge palace, archaeological evidence said to have had nine storeys and could accommodate around 1000 monks and attendants.

The current stand of pillars (now fenced off) is all that remains from the last rebuild – that of King Parakramabahu around the 12th century.

Abhayagiri Dagaba

The Abhayagiri Dagaba is situated in Anuradhapura, Sri Lanka. It was built during the reign of King Wattagamini Abhaya (commonly known as King Valagamba). It is one of the most extensive ruins in the world and one of the most sacred Buddhist pilgrimage cities. Historically it was a great monastic centre as well as a royal capital, with magnificent monasteries rising to many stories, roofed with gilt bronze or tiles of burnt clay glazed in brilliant colours. To the north of the city, encircled by great walls and containing elaborate bathing ponds, carved balustrades and moonstones, stood "Abhayagiri", one of seventeen such religious units in Anuradhapura and the largest of its five major viharas. Surrounding the humped dagaba, Abhayagiri Vihara was a seat of the Northern Monastery, or Uttara Vihara.

The 1st or 2nd century BC built Abhayagiri dageba (confused by some books and maps with the Jetavanarama), was the centrepiece of a monastery of 5000 monks. The name means ‘Hill of Protection’ or ‘Fearless Hill’, another claim ‘Giri’ was the name of a local Jain monk. The monastery was part of the ‘School of the Secret Forest’, a heretical sect that studied both Mahayana and Theravada Buddhism, also Chinese traveller Faxian (also spelt Fa Hsien) visited in AD 412.

The dageba was probably rebuilt several times to reach its peak 75m height. It has some interesting bas-reliefs, including one near the western stairway of an elephant pulling up a tree. A large slab with a Buddha footprint can be seen on the northern side, and the eastern and western steps have unusual moonstones made from concentric stone slabs.

Jetavanaramaya

The Jetavanaramaya is a stupa, located in the ruins of Jetavana Monastery in the sacred world heritage city of Anuradhapura, Sri Lanka. King Mahasena (273-301 AD) initiated the construction of the stupa following the destruction of Mahavihara, his son Meghavanna resume the construction work of the stupa. A part of a sash or belt tied by the Buddha is believed to be the relic that is enshrined here.

The archaeologists believe it may have the original height over 100m, but today is about 70m, and also this was a similar height to the Abhayagiri as well. When it was built, it was the third-tallest monument in the world, the first two being Egyptian pyramids. A British guidebook from the early 20th century calculated that there were enough bricks in the dageba's brick core to make a 3m-high wall stretching from London to Edinburgh.

Behind it stand the ruins of a monastery that could accommodate around 3000 monks, and one building has doorjambs over 8 m high which is still standing, with another 3 m underground. At one time, massive doors opened to reveal a large Buddha image.

Mirisaveti Stupa

The Mirisaveti Stupa is situated in the ancient city of Anuradhapura, Sri Lanka. King Dutugamunu built the Mirisaveti Stupa after defeating King Elara. After placing the Buddha relics in the sceptre, he had gone to Tisawewa for a bath leaving the sceptre. After the bath he returned to the place where the sceptre was placed, and it is said that it could not be moved. The stupa was built in the place where the sceptre stood. It is also said that he remembered that he partook a chilly curry without offering it to the sangha. In order to punish himself he built the Mirisavetiya Dagaba. Although the king Kasyapa I and Kasyapa V renovated this, from time to time it was dilapidated. What stands today is the renovation done by the cultural Triangle Fund.

Lankarama

Lankarama is a stupa built by King Valagamba, in an ancient place at Galhebakada in the ancient kingdom of Anuradhapura, Sri Lanka. Nothing is known about the ancient form of the stupa, and later this was renovated. The ruins show that there are rows of stone pillars and it is no doubt that there has been a house built encircling the stupa (vatadage) to cover it.

See also
Cetiya
Solosmasthana

References

Anuradhapura
Buddhism in Sri Lanka
Theravada
Tourist attractions in North Central Province, Sri Lanka